Joseph Hellegouarc'h (22 May 1920 – 1 May 2004) was a French scholar (1963), professor of Latin language and literature at Charles de Gaulle University – Lille III, then Paris-Sorbonne University.

He left an impressive scientific work, oriented towards the study of political vocabulary, metric, stylistic studies and literature.

Publications 
He completed the publication and translation of Latin authors in the series "Universités de France" by éditions des Belles Lettres:

 Tacitus, Histoires, in collaboration with Henri Le Bonniec and Pierre Wuilleumier
 Tacitus, Annales, in collaboration with Henri Le Bonniec and Pierre Wuilleumier
 Eutropius, Abrégé d'histoire romaine
 Velleius Paterculus, Histoire romaine
 Sallust, La Conjuration de Catilina, La Guerre de Jugurtha Fragments des Histoires 
 Horace, Odes et

External links 
 Le monosyllabe dans l'hexamètre latin. Essai de métrique verbale (compte rendu) on Persée
 Rhétorique et poésie dans la Pharsale de Lucain (article) on Persée 

French Latinists
Latin–French translators
1920 births
2004 deaths
20th-century translators